Puppet Master II is a 1990 direct-to-video horror film written by David Pabian and directed by Dave Allen. It is the second film in the Puppet Master franchise, the sequel to 1989's Puppet Master, and stars Elizabeth Maclellan, Gregory Webb, Charlie Spradling, Jeff Weston and Nita Talbot as paranormal investigators who are terrorized by the animate creations of an undead puppeteer, played by Steve Welles.

Puppet Master II, as well as the third, fourth and fifth installments of the series, were only available in DVD format through a Full Moon Features box set that was briefly discontinued, until in 2007 when Full Moon Features reacquired the rights to the first five films. A remastered edition Blu-ray and DVD of the film was released on September 18, 2012.

Plot

André Toulon's grave is being excavated in Shady Oaks cemetery behind the Bodega Bay Inn. Pinhead dusts off and opens André Toulon's casket, then climbs out and pours a vial of neon liquid on the corpse, while Tunneler, Leech Woman, Blade and Jester watch on from the grave’s edge as the skeleton’s arms rise into the air. A few months later, parapsychologists Carolyn Bramwell, her brother Patrick, and the flirtatious Lance and Wanda, are sent to the hotel to investigate the strange murder of Megan Gallagher, whose brain was extracted through her nose (by Blade). Alex Whitaker, driven insane from the events of the first film, is suspected of the murder of Megan Gallagher and locked up in an asylum. While at the asylum, his terrible seizures and premonitions are perceived as lunatic rantings.

Their guest psychic, Camille Kenney, decides to leave after spotting two puppets in her room and warning the others they aren't safe; however, while packing, Pinhead and Jester attack and kidnap her. The next day, Carolyn calls Michael, Camille's son, after finding her belongings and car still at the hotel but Camille missing. That evening, while Patrick is sleeping, he's killed by Tunneler when the puppet drills into his head. Lance and Wanda run in and Lance kills Tunneler by crushing him with a lamp. They dissect Tunneler and realize that the puppets are not remote controlled, but rather they run on a chemical they determine is the secret of artificial intelligence.

The next morning, a man named Eriquee Chaneé (the reanimated Toulon in disguise) enters the hotel, stating that he had inherited it after Megan's death, and that he has just returned from Bucharest. They doubt his claim, but he tells them they can stay and investigate although his quarters are off limits to them. Afterwards, Michael arrives at the hotel, worried about Camille. That evening, Blade and Leech Woman go to a local farmer's house where Leech Woman kills the husband, Matthew, taking his eye. His wife, Martha manages to throw Leech Woman into the furnace. As Martha is about to shoot Blade with a shotgun, a new puppet, Torch, walks in and kills Martha with a flame-thrower built into his arm. Blade takes a piece of her charred remains and he and Torch return to Eriquee/Toulon where it's revealed he believes that Carolyn is a reincarnation of his now deceased wife, Elsa. Toulon has a flashback to Cairo, 1912 when he and Elsa bought the formula for animating inanimate objects.

The next morning, Michael and Carolyn go into town to find Camille and to find out more about Eriquee Chanee. Meanwhile, the puppets are killing various people because they are growing weaker and need the secret ingredient that makes Toulon's formula: brain tissue. (This is why they needed Megan's brain to reanimate Toulon) Carolyn finds no records of "Eriquee Chaneé", and starts to connect him to the disappearance of Camille and the death of her brother, Patrick. Later, Carolyn and Michael share a romantic night together, as do Lance and Wanda. While Wanda goes back to her room, Blade kills Lance, killing Wanda afterwards. After killing them, he uses their tissue for the formula.

During this, Carolyn sneaks into Toulon's room, and finds two life sized mannequins in the wardrobe. Toulon sneaks up behind Carolyn, and still thinking she is Elsa, ties her up. Michael, hearing her screams, wakes up and goes to rescue her, all while fighting off Torch, Pinhead, and Blade. On his way up, the dumbwaiter opens, revealing Jester and Michael's dead mother, Camille. Toulon transfers his soul into one of the mannequins, and explains that after seeing Carolyn, he decided for them to live together forever. The puppets, upon hearing this, realize Toulon used them for his evil needs, and start torturing him. Michael then breaks into the room, saves Carolyn, and the two run out of the hotel. Up in the attic, Torch sets Toulon on fire, causing him to fall out a window and die. Afterward, Jester goes back to Camille's body with the remaining of the formula.

After her soul has been placed into the female mannequin, the 'revived' Camille decides to drive the puppets to the Bouldeston Institution for the Mentally Troubled Tots and Teens in her car, so they can "enchant" the children.

Cast
 Steve Welles as André Toulon / Eriquee Chaneé
 Elizabeth Maclellan as Carolyn Bramwell  / Elsa Toulon
 Michael Todd as Puppet Toulon
 Julianne Mazziotti as Puppet Camille / Elsa Toulon
 Collin Bernsen as Michael Kenney
 Greg Webb as Patrick Bramwell (as Gregory Webb)
 Charlie Spradling as Wanda
 Jeff Weston as Lance
 Nita Talbot as Camille Kenney
 Sage Allen as Martha
 George Buck Flower as Mathew
 Sean B. Ryan as Billy
 Alex Band and Taryn Band as Cairo Children

Featured puppets
Blade
Jester
Pinhead
Tunneler
Leech Woman
Torch
Mephisto (flashback)
Djinn the Homunculus (flashback)

Reception
In a contemporary review, Variety described the film as "okay followup to the gory William Hickey-starrer" and that the "Use of stop-motion puppet effects should please genre fans."

References

Footnotes

Sources

External links
 
 

American supernatural horror films
1990 films
1990 direct-to-video films
1990 horror films
Full Moon Features films
Puppet films
Puppet Master (film series)
American sequel films
Films directed by David W. Allen
Films scored by Richard Band
1990s English-language films
1990s American films